Shaun Johnston is a Canadian movie and theatre actor best known for his role as Jack Bartlett on the CBC drama Heartland, which debuted in October 2007. He co-founded the Shadow Theatre in Edmonton and made his first professional forays in Alberta's thriving theatre scene.

Biography
Johnston grew up in Ponoka, Alberta. He earned a Bachelor of Fine Arts from the University of Alberta's drama program.

Johnston is well-known for playing the role of Jack Bartlett (also known as "Grandpa Jack") on Heartland, a CBC drama that debuted in October 2007. By 2019, he had played a role on the show for 13 seasons. In 2019, and again in 2020, Johnston was nominated for a Rosie award for "Best Alberta Actor" for his role in Heartland. In 2016, Johnston described his experience on the cast of Heartland, saying "it's the best job I’ve ever had, it's the best job I'm ever going to have."

In 2020, Global News reported that Johnston was in the process of "recording and releasing" The Book of Shaun: A Story Behind His Heartland Music. The Book of Shaun is a multi-episode music project that tells "the story behind songs that he has written for the Canadian TV show" that was created in order to raise funds for a 20-home building project led by the Okanagan affiliate of Habitat for Humanity.

Filmography

Film 
 1990 Blood Clan as Jerry
 1997 Ms. Bear as Barney Porter
 1998 Heart of the Sun as Harry
 1999 Mystery, Alaska as District Attorney Doloff
 1999 Silver Wolf as Frank McLean
 2001 Viva Las Nowhere as Sheriff
 2004 Ginger Snaps 2: Unleashed as Jack
 2005 Supervolcano as Matt
 2005 A Friend of the Family as Coleridge
 2006 Broken Trail as Jack "Smallpox Jack"
 2007 Carolina Moon as Hannabal Bodeen
 2007 Bury My Heart at Wounded Knee as Colonel Nelson A. Miles
 2009 Screamers: The Hunting as Haggard Man
 2019 In Plainview as Reverend Rickman

Television
 1995 The X-Files as Pete Calcagni
 1995-1997 Jake and the Kid as Jake Trumper 
 1996-2000 Traders as Ben Sullivan
 1998-2001 Mentors as Roy Cates
 1998-2005 Da Vinci's Inquest as Marshal Sid Flemming
 2000 The Outer Limits as Parker
 2001 Smallville as Jordan's Dad
 2004 Chicks with Sticks as Luke
 2016 Delmer & Marta as Tom
 2016-2018 Wynonna Earp as Juan Carlos
 2007–Present Heartland as Jackson "Jack" Bartlett

References

External links 
 
 Shaun Johnston

Living people
Male actors from Alberta
Canadian male film actors
Canadian male television actors
Canadian male voice actors
Year of birth missing (living people)